The following table lists polar-ring galaxies:

List

Inner Polar Rings
Some galaxies feature a "polar ring" within the disk of the galaxy
 UGC 5600

See also
 Lists of astronomical objects
 List of galaxies

References

Polar-ring